The electoral district of Nepean is an electorate of the Victorian Legislative Assembly covering the southernmost part of the Mornington Peninsula in Victoria, Australia. It is named after Point Nepean which is contained within the electorate.

The seat was created prior to the 2002 Victorian state election as a replacement for Dromana. Like its predecessor, historically it had been a relatively safe seat for the Liberal Party, although Labor came within 0.2% of winning it in 2002. In 2018, however, it was swept up in the massive Labor wave that swept through eastern Melbourne, with Chris Brayne succeeding retiring longtime Liberal incumbent and former minister Martin Dixon. Brayne is only the second Labor member ever to win the seat in either of its incarnations.

The seat has the oldest median age of any electorate in the state.

Members for Nepean

Election results

References

External links
 Electorate profile: Nepean, Victorian Electoral Commission

2002 establishments in Australia
Electoral districts of Victoria (Australia)
Mornington Peninsula
Sorrento, Victoria
Electoral districts and divisions of Greater Melbourne